The Penelakut are a large (about 1000 individuals) Hul'qumi'num-speaking First Nation. They live primarily on Penelakut Island (formerly Kuper Island) near the south end of Vancouver Island, and Galiano Island. Their land stretches to Tent Island which is private and currently uninhabited. 

The name Penelakut comes from penálaxeth', the village on the northeast end of Penelakut Island, once the largest Hul'qumi'num-speaking village in the Gulf Islands. Penálaxeth' means "log buried on the beach", which may refer to the many longhouses  that were once on the beach near there.

References

External links
Penelakut Homepage
Gallery of Penelakut Artwork
Penelakut - Hul'qumi'num Treaty Group

First Nations in British Columbia
Gulf Islands
Southern Vancouver Island
Coast Salish